Suregada is a plant genus of the family Euphorbiaceae, first described as a genus in 1803. It is native to tropical and subtropical regions of Africa, the Indian Subcontinent, China, Southeast Asia, Australia, and certain oceanic islands.

Species

formerly included
moved to Tetrorchidium 
Suregada angolensis - Tetrorchidium didymostemon

References 

Euphorbiaceae genera
Crotonoideae